Gilbertiodendron bilineatum is a species of plant in the family Fabaceae. It is found in Ivory Coast, Ghana, Liberia, and Sierra Leone. It is threatened by habitat loss.

References

bilineatum
Flora of West Tropical Africa
Vulnerable plants
Taxonomy articles created by Polbot